

This is a list of the Pennsylvania state historical markers in Bradford County.

This is intended to be a complete list of the official state historical markers placed in Bradford County, Pennsylvania by the Pennsylvania Historical and Museum Commission (PHMC). The locations of the historical markers, as well as the latitude and longitude coordinates as provided by the PHMC's database, are included below when available. There are 46 historical markers located in Bradford County.

Historical markers

See also

List of Pennsylvania state historical markers
National Register of Historic Places listings in Bradford County, Pennsylvania

References

External links
Pennsylvania Historical Marker Program
Pennsylvania Historical & Museum Commission

Pennsylvania state historical markers in Bradford County
Bradford County
Tourist attractions in Bradford County, Pennsylvania